Adel is an unincorporated community in eastern Franklin Township, Owen County, in the U.S. state of Indiana. It lies near the bridge on County Road 150 West over Raccoon Creek, which is a community nearly ten miles southwest of the city of Spencer, the county seat.  Its elevation is 541 feet (165 m), and it is located at  (39.1919894, -86.7958389).

History
Adel was founded in 1859. A post office was established at Adel in 1889, and remained in operation until it was discontinued in 1906.

Geography
Adel Cemetery is in this community, and it is located at  (39.1900450 -86.7966723).

School districts
 Spencer-Owen Community Schools, including a high school.

Political districts
 State House District 46
 State Senate District 39

References

External links
 Roadside Thoughts for Adel, Indiana

Unincorporated communities in Owen County, Indiana
Unincorporated communities in Indiana
Bloomington metropolitan area, Indiana